Liu Yanfei (born 15 February 1967) is a Chinese speed skater. He competed at the 1988 Winter Olympics, the 1992 Winter Olympics and the 1994 Winter Olympics.

References

1967 births
Living people
Chinese male speed skaters
Olympic speed skaters of China
Speed skaters at the 1988 Winter Olympics
Speed skaters at the 1992 Winter Olympics
Speed skaters at the 1994 Winter Olympics
Place of birth missing (living people)
Speed skaters at the 1990 Asian Winter Games
Speed skaters at the 1996 Asian Winter Games
20th-century Chinese people